Sari Kand-e Dadash Beyk (also Romanized as Sārī Kand-e Dādāsh Beyk) is a village in Chaypareh-ye Pain Rural District, Zanjanrud District, Zanjan County, Zanjan Province, Iran. At the 2006 census, its population was 116, in 23 families.

References 

Populated places in Zanjan County